Olivier Cazal (born 1962, Toulouse) is a French pianist.

He was awarded 2nd prizes at the 1988 Maria Canals Competition, the 1991 Concorso Busoni (ex-aequo with Igor Kamenz), the 1991 Long-Thibaud Competition, and the 1992 Sydney International Piano Competition.  He won 1st prize at the 1993 Premio de Jaén.

Cazal is internationally active as a concert pianist, and has recorded Francis Poulenc's complete piano works for Naxos Records.

References
  Naxos Records

External links
 Performance of Sergey Prokofiev's 3rd Piano Concerto (coda)

Living people
1962 births
21st-century French male classical pianists
20th-century French male classical pianists
Sydney International Piano Competition prize-winners
Prize-winners of the Ferruccio Busoni International Piano Competition
Long-Thibaud-Crespin Competition prize-winners